John Grant Malcolmson,  (9 February 1835 – 14 August 1902) was a Bengal Army officer and a Scottish recipient of the Victoria Cross, the highest award for gallantry in the face of the enemy that can be awarded to British and Commonwealth forces.

Details
Malcolmson was 21 years old, and a lieutenant in the 3rd Bombay Light Cavalry, Indian Army during the Persian War when the following deed took place for which he and Arthur Thomas Moore were awarded the VC.

The following year, he took part in the Central Indian campaign of 1858 during the Indian Rebellion. He later achieved the rank of captain, and served in the Honourable Corps of Gentlemen at Arms.

Shortly before his death, he was invested as a Member (fourth class) of the Royal Victorian Order (MVO) by King Edward VII at Buckingham Palace on 11 August 1902 (the order was gazetted after his death).

He died, suddenly, at Bramham Gardens, London, on 14 August 1902. His Victoria Cross is held by the National Army Museum in Chelsea.

See also
List of Scottish Victoria Cross recipients

References

External links
Early Victoria Cross given to museum by 'once in a lifetime' family donation (The Telegraph)
Malcolmson VC: Hero of the Persian War (National Army Museum)
Location of grave and VC medal (Kensal Green Cemetery)

British recipients of the Victoria Cross
British East India Company Army officers
Members of the Royal Victorian Order
1835 births
1902 deaths
British military personnel of the Anglo-Persian War
Burials at Kensal Green Cemetery
Military personnel from Inverness
British military personnel of the Indian Rebellion of 1857
Honourable Corps of Gentlemen at Arms